The 'West Midlands Police Museum is located in a Victorian cell block on Steelhouse Lane, Birmingham, England, which was operational from 1891 until 2016. 

One of two museums operated by the West Midlands Police, (the other being in Coventry) The Lock-up is open to the public and for school/group visits and special events. Visit the website for more details: https://museum.west-midlands.police.uk.
 
The museum houses comprehensive artifacts and archives of the West Midlands Police and its predecessors dating back to before the formation of Birmingham City Police in 1839, as well as a small collection of paintings, including a portrait of Sir Charles Horton Rafter, the longest-serving Chief Constable of Birmingham. The archives contain many records of  police officers who served in the area of the present West Midlands Police and are of particular interest to genealogists.

The museum re-opened in April 2022 at the Victorian listed cell block at Steelhouse Lane police station following a heritage lottery-funded refurbishment.  .

References

External links 

 Official website
 Paintings held at the museum

Museums in Birmingham, West Midlands
West Midlands Police
Law enforcement museums in England
Birmingham City Police
Sparkhill
Former courthouses in England